Pediasia palmitiella is a moth in the family Crambidae. It was described by Pierre Chrétien in 1915. It is found in Morocco and Algeria.

References

Crambini
Moths described in 1915
Moths of Africa